Laurie Nunn (born May 1986) is an English screenwriter and playwright best known for creating the Netflix comedy-drama series Sex Education.

Nunn was born in London, England, to British theatre director Trevor Nunn and Australian actress Sharon Lee-Hill. At age 14 she moved to Australia. She received a BA in Film and Television from the Victorian College of the Arts in 2007 and an MA in screenwriting at the National Film and Television School in England in 2012. In 2017, she was short-listed for the Bruntwood Prize for King Brown, her first full-length play.

References

External links

1986 births
Living people
Victorian College of the Arts alumni
Alumni of the National Film and Television School
English female screenwriters
English women dramatists and playwrights
21st-century British dramatists and playwrights
21st-century British screenwriters
21st-century English women writers
Writers from London
English people of Australian descent